Veerachinnampatty is a village in Dindigul district, Tamil Nadu, India. This village is located on the way of Dindigul and Natham highway. This village is a separate panchayat in sanarpatty union.

School

Pums Veerachinnampatty is a Primary with Upper Primary School in Veerachinampatty Village of Sanarpatty.	It was established in 1907, and the school management is Local body. It is a Tamil Medium - Co-educational school.

Pums Veerachinnampatty runs in a government school building. The school has total 9 classrooms. The lowest Class is 1 and the highest class in the school is 8. This school has 3 male teachers and 5 female teachers. There is a library facility available in this school, and the total number of books in library is about 810.

This school also has a playground. Pums Veerachinnampatty does not provide any residential facility. The school also provides meal facility, and meals are prepared in school.

Murugan Temple

Veerachinnampatty Murugan Temple was built in 1957. It is context by Velu Pillai. Veerachinnampatty Murugan Temple location is near the river. So, the temple is called Aathankarai Murugan Temple. It is a very powerful temple. The temple's important celebrations are Thaipoosam and Panguni Utthiram. One of the best celebrations is Panguni Utthiram. The village people celebrate Panguni Utthiram very joyfully. Veettu pangalis property, this temple. One of the poosaari ganesan pillai. It is built by Velu Pillai and Muthu Pillai.

References

External links
Veerachinnampatty location

Villages in Dindigul district